This is the list of awards and nominations received by Maggie Smith, whose acting career in motion pictures, television, and on stage spans over 60 years.

Among her major competitive awards, Smith has won two Oscars, five BAFTAs (including a record four for Best Actress), four Emmys, and a Tony Award. Other significant awards include three Golden Globes, five Screen Actors Guild Awards, and a record six Best Actress Evening Standard Theatre Awards. Smith is one of only 14 actresses to have achieved the Triple Crown of Acting, which is competitive Academy Award, Emmy Award, and Tony Award wins in the acting categories. Overall in her career she has won 58 competitive awards from 157 nominations. She has also received numerous honorary awards, including the BAFTA Special Award (1993), the BAFTA Fellowship (1996), and the Special Olivier Award (2010).

Triple Crown of Acting

Academy Awards

Tony Awards

Emmy Awards

Major Awards

BAFTA Awards

Golden Globe Awards

Notes
E  Tied with Ellen Burstyn for Same Time, Next Year.

Screen Actors Guild Awards

Notes
A  Shared with Eileen Atkins, Bob Balaban, Alan Bates, Charles Dance, Stephen Fry, Michael Gambon, Richard E. Grant, Tom Hollander, Derek Jacobi, Kelly Macdonald, Helen Mirren, Jeremy Northam, Clive Owen, Ryan Phillippe, Geraldine Somerville, Kristin Scott Thomas, Sophie Thompson, Emily Watson, and James Wilby.
B  Shared with Judi Dench, Celia Imrie, Bill Nighy, Dev Patel, Ronald Pickup, Tom Wilkinson, and Penelope Wilton.
M  Shared with Hugh Bonneville, Zoe Boyle, Laura Carmichael, Jim Carter, Brendan Coyle, Michelle Dockery, Jessica Brown Findlay, Siobhan Finneran, Joanne Froggatt, Iain Glen, Thomas Howes, Rob James-Collier, Allen Leech, Phyllis Logan, Elizabeth McGovern, Sophie McShera, Lesley Nicol, Amy Nuttall, David Robb, Dan Stevens, and Penelope Wilton.

Other Theatre Awards

Olivier Awards

Drama Desk Awards

Evening Standard Theatre Awards

Gershwin Theatre Awards

Outer Critics Circle Awards

Critics Awards

Chicago Film Critics Association Awards

Critics' Choice Awards

Dallas–Fort Worth Film Critics Association Awards

Florida Film Critics Circle Awards

Kansas City Film Critics Circle Awards

London Film Critics' Circle

Los Angeles Drama Critics Circle Awards

Notes
G  Tied with Brian Bedford for Private Lives, Roscoe Lee Browne for Dream on Monkey Mountain, and Lou Gossett for Murderous Angels.

National Board of Review Awards

Notes
H  Shared with Bette Midler, Goldie Hawn, Diane Keaton, Dan Hedaya, Sarah Jessica Parker, Stockard Channing, Victor Garber, Stephen Collins, Elizabeth Berkley, Marcia Gay Harden, Bronson Pinchot, Jennifer Dundas, Eileen Heckart, Philip Bosco, Rob Reiner, James Naughton, Ari Greenberg, and Aida Linares.

National Society of Film Critics Awards

Notes
I  Tied with Verna Bloom for Medium Cool and Ingrid Thulin for The Damned.

New York Film Critics Circle Awards

Notes
J  Tied with Anjelica Huston for The Dead.

New York Film Critics Online Awards

Phoenix Film Critics Society Awards

Notes
A  The cast nomination included also Eileen Atkins, Bob Balaban, Alan Bates, Charles Dance, Stephen Fry, Michael Gambon, Richard E. Grant, Tom Hollander, Derek Jacobi, Kelly Macdonald, Helen Mirren, Jeremy Northam, Clive Owen, Ryan Phillippe, Geraldine Somerville, Kristin Scott Thomas, Sophie Thompson, Emily Watson, and James Wilby.
L  Shared with Kenneth Branagh, John Cleese, Robbie Coltrane, Warwick Davis, Richard Griffiths, Rupert Grint, Richard Harris, Jason Isaacs, Daniel Radcliffe, Alan Rickman, Fiona Shaw, Julie Walters, and Emma Watson.

San Diego Film Critics Society Awards

Utah Film Critics Association Awards

Women Film Critics Circle Awards

Other Awards

Actors Hall of Fame Foundation Awards

Alfred Toepfer Stiftung Awards

American Comedy Awards

American Movie Awards

Avenue of Stars

Bodleian Library

British Film Institute Awards

British Independent Film Awards

Broadcasting Press Guild Awards

European Film Awards

Evening Standard British Film Awards

Notes
D  Tied with Billie Whitelaw for The Dressmaker.

Gershwin Theatre Awards

Helpmann Awards

Laurel Awards

Monte-Carlo Television Festival Awards

Online Film & Television Association Awards

Notes
K  Tied with Evan Rachel Wood for Mildred Pierce.

Online Film Critics Society Awards

Notes
A  Shared with Eileen Atkins, Bob Balaban, Alan Bates, Charles Dance, Stephen Fry, Michael Gambon, Richard E. Grant, Tom Hollander, Derek Jacobi, Kelly Macdonald, Helen Mirren, Jeremy Northam, Clive Owen, Ryan Phillippe, Geraldine Somerville, Kristin Scott Thomas, Sophie Thompson, Emily Watson, and James Wilby.

Outer Critics Circle Awards

Notes
L  Tied with Anthony Hopkins and Peter Firth for Equus, Geraldine Page for Absurd Person Singular, and John Cullum and Chip Ford for Shenandoah.

People's Choice Awards

Royal Television Society Awards

Satellite Awards

Notes
A  Shared with Eileen Atkins, Bob Balaban, Alan Bates, Charles Dance, Stephen Fry, Michael Gambon, Richard E. Grant, Tom Hollander, Derek Jacobi, Kelly Macdonald, Helen Mirren, Jeremy Northam, Clive Owen, Ryan Phillippe, Geraldine Somerville, Kristin Scott Thomas, Sophie Thompson, Emily Watson, and James Wilby.

Saturn Awards

Shakespeare Theatre Company Awards

Stratford Shakespeare Festival Awards

Taormina Film Fest Awards

TV Guide Awards

TVTimes Awards

University of Bath

University of Cambridge

University of St Andrews

Variety Club Drama Awards

Whatsonstage.com Awards

Notes
O  Shared with co-star Judi Dench for the same play.

References
General

Specific

External links
 
 
 

Smith, Maggie